Ancylodes lapsalis is a species of snout moth in the genus Ancylodes. It was described by Francis Walker in 1859 and is known from Sri Lanka and Australia.

References

Moths described in 1859
Phycitini
Moths of Sri Lanka
Moths of Australia